Race is a racing simulator computer game based on the World Touring Car Championship released in November 2006. The game was developed and published by SimBin Studios (later Sector3 Studios), who had earlier produced critically acclaimed racing simulators like GTR and GT Legends, and distributed by Eidos in Europe and by Valve across their Steam network. The first expansion pack, Caterham Expansion was released in June 2007 featuring new cars and tracks.

The game features almost all drivers and all of the teams and tracks from the 2006 World Touring Car Championship season.

It was followed by a sequel in 2007, named Race 07.

Reception
GameSpot reviewed the game stating: "Simbin follows up its GTR 2 success with another great PC racing sim, this time set in the World Touring Car series". They also awarded the game a score of 8.8 (Great).

References

External links 

2006 video games
Eidos Interactive games
Racing simulators
SimBin Studios games
Video games developed in Sweden
Video games set in Brazil
Video games set in China
Video games set in the Czech Republic
Video games set in France
Video games set in Germany
Video games set in Italy
Video games set in Mexico
Video games set in Spain
Video games set in Turkey
Video games set in the United Kingdom
Video games with expansion packs
Windows games
Windows-only games
World Touring Car Championship